Nicholas Cristesham (died c. 1403), of Wells, Somerset, was an English politician.

Family
Cristesham was the son of John Cristesham. He seems to have spent his life in Wells. Nicholas married a woman named Maud.

Career
He was a Member (MP) of the Parliament of England for Wells in
1366, 1372, 1373, January 1377, October 1377, 1378, January 1380, 1381, October 1383, April 1384, 1386, February 1388 and 1395.

References

14th-century births
1400s deaths
English MPs 1366
People from Wells, Somerset
English MPs 1372
English MPs 1373
English MPs January 1377
English MPs October 1377
English MPs 1378
English MPs January 1380
English MPs 1381
English MPs October 1383
English MPs April 1384
English MPs 1386
English MPs February 1388
English MPs 1395